Together is a greatest hits album by Reef released in 2003. It contains most of the band's singles and some non-LP tracks. Track 14 is a cover of Mickey Newbury's "Just Dropped In (To See What Condition My Condition Was In)".

Track listing
 "Give Me Your Love" – 3:53
 "Good Feeling" – 3:47
 "Naked" – 3:12
 "Weird" – 2:54
 "Place Your Hands" – 3:38
 "Come Back Brighter" – 3:33
 "Consideration" – 3:34
 "Yer Old" – 3:12
 "I've Got Something to Say" – 4:06
 "Set the Record Straight" – 3:55
 "Lucky Number" – 3:28
 "Stone For Your Love" – 2:32
 "Talk to Me" – 3:05
 "Just Dropped In (To See What Condition My Condition Was In)" – 2:52

References

2003 compilation albums
Reef (band) albums